Avinashi Road, is an arterial road in Coimbatore, India. Running from east to west, the road starts at Uppilipalayam flyover and ends at Neelambur by-pass junction where it joins NH 544, Beyond Neelambur Junction, the road branches into two, with one traversing southwards to Madukarai to form the Coimbatore bypass while the other continues westwards to Avinashi and beyond to form the National Highway 544. This road connects Coimbatore to its airport and the east and north-east suburbs. The road was an indicator of development as the city of Coimbatore grew up mostly along its eastern and western sides.

Description

Avinashi Road is of the main gateway into the city by road as well as from North and Eastern parts of India. This road is also home for Educational Institutions, Major speciality hospitals, Corporate offices, Information technology parks, Shopping malls and Luxury hotels. Today, this road has turned out to be the most important arterial road in the city.
This road is gateway to vehicles coming from East and North-East Tamil Nadu and bound for Tirupur, Erode, Salem, Vellore, Chennai, Bangalore. The road once part of National highways 544 (Salem - Cochin Highway) is now maintained by the Tamil Nadu Highways Department.  In recent years the road was widened into a six-lane. This 16-km stretch of road running diagonally across the city in East West orientation slightly moving North East tangent.a Avinashi road starts from Uppilipalayam flyover near Grey Town area, it passes through the important neighbourhoods of Peelamedu and Chinniampalayam and finally Neelambur.

Places transversed 
Anna Silai junction
Chinniampalayam
Civil Aerodrome
Goldwins
Thottipalayam Pirivu
Hope College
Lakshmi Mills junction
Mylampatty
Nava India
Neelambur
Papanaickenpalayam
Peelamedu
SITRA (Airport signal)
Uppilipalayam Flyover 
VOC Park & LIC junction

Landmarks on Avinashi Road

Major Hotels
 The Residency Towers Coimbatore
 The Orbis Hotels
 Radisson Blu
 Le Méridien
 Fairfield by Marriott
 Ibis Coimbatore City Centre
 Jenney's Residency
 Grand Regent
 Satyam Grand
 Park Plaza
 GRT Grand
The Arcadia

Railway Stations
Peelamedu Railway station

Airport 
Coimbatore International Airport, Peelamedu, Coimbatore

Major Landmarks

Art Gallery & Museums
G. D. Naidu Industrial Exhibition
Gedee Car Museum
Kasthuri Srinivasan Art Gallery

Parks & Recreation
VOC Park Grounds 
Coimbatore Zoo

Research Institutes
The South India Textile Research Association a.k.a. SITRA
Sardar Vallabhbhai Patel International School of Textiles and Management
UMS Technologies Training Centre

Educational Institutions

Stanes Anglo Indian Higher Secondary School
GRG Matriculation Higher Secondary School
National Model Schools
PSG College of Technology
PSG College of Arts and Science
PSG Institute of Management Coimbatore
PSG Institute of Medical Sciences & Research
Coimbatore Medical College
Government Polytechnic College
Coimbatore Institute of Technology
Dr G R Damodaran College of Science

IT-Parks
TIDEL Park Coimbatore
Hanudev InfoPark
ELCOT IT Park [Under Construction]
ELCOT SEZ, Coimbatore

MNC Companies
Accenture
Bosch
Capgemini
IBM
Infosys
State Street HCL Services
Tata Consultancy Services
Tech Mahindra
UST Global
Wipro

Other Notable Landmark
Anna Statue
Passport Seva Kendra
PSG Tech skywalk

Shopping
Fun Republic Mall

Cinemas
Cinépolis- 5 Screens

Textile Mills
Lakshmi Mills
Radhakrishna Mills
Tirupur Textile Mills
Varadaraja Mills

Hospitals
Aravind Eye Hospital
G. Kuppusamy Naidu Memorial Hospital
Kovai Medical Center Hospital (KMCH)
Lotus Eye Care Hospital
PSG Hospitals

Exhibition Venues
Padmavathi Ammal Cultural Center
CODDISIA Trade Fair Grounds

Major Flyovers
 Avinashi Road Expressway, Coimbatore
 Avinashi Road flyover
 Hope College Flyover

Coimbatore Metro
Coimbatore Metro feasibility study is completed and one of the route planned from Kaniyur through Avinashi road till Ukkadam Bus stand covering 26 km.

References

External links

Central business districts in India
Roads in Coimbatore